The Yangmingtan Bridge is a suspension bridge spanning  over the Songhua River in Harbin, China.

Collapse
A part of the newly inaugurated  bridge spanning the Songhua River collapsed on August 24, 2012, at 5 am, killing 3 people and injuring 2 others. Problems seem to have occurred due to the weight of trucks using the bridge. The bridge was designed to handle 55 tons, but the combined weight of heavy trucks, amounting to at least 500 tons, caused the bridge to collapse. The collapse was blamed mostly on the construction design and on the project's having been finished too quickly and on traffic controllers having allowed, onto the bridge, vehicles of excessive weight.

See also
List of longest suspension bridge spans

References

Buildings and structures in Harbin
Road bridges in China